Robert Kaiser (born 27 February 1946) is an Austrian footballer. He played in one match for the Austria national football team in 1969.

References

External links
 

1946 births
Living people
Austrian footballers
Austria international footballers
Place of birth missing (living people)
Association footballers not categorized by position